Shogaols are pungent constituents of ginger similar in chemical structure to gingerol. The most common of the group is [6]-shogaol.  Like zingerone, it is produced when ginger is dried or cooked.  Moreover, shogaol (and gingerol) are converted to other constituents when heat is applied over time, which is why ginger loses its spiciness as it is cooked.

The name shogaol is derived from the Japanese name for ginger (生姜、shōga).

Shogaol is rated 160,000 SHU on the Scoville scale. When compared to other pungent compounds, shogaol is moderately more pungent than piperine, but less than capsaicin.

Shogaols group
[4]-Shogaol, [8]-shogaol, [10]-shogaol, and [12]-shogaol (all found in ginger) together constitute the group shogaols.  There also exist in ginger cultivars methylated shogaols: methyl [6]-shogaol and methyl [8]-shogaol, respectively.

Shogaols are artifacts formed during storage or through excess heat, probably created by a dehydration reaction of the gingerols. The ratio of shogaols to gingerols sometimes is taken as an indication of product quality.

Synthesis 
A possible synthesis starts with a Claisen condensation of vanillin and acetone, producing dehydrozingerone. Afterwards the product reacts in an aldol condensation with hexanal in tetrahydrofurane to 6-dehydroshogaol and 6-dehydrogingerol. Latter can be hydrogenated to [6]-gingerol by a catalyst. In the last step hydrochloric acid is added to get the desired [6]-shogaol.

References

Pungent flavors
O-methylated natural phenols
Ginger